ENW or enw may refer to:

 Kenosha Regional Airport, Wisconsin, US (by IATA and FAA LID codes)
 Palo Blanco Airstrip, Mexico (by DGAC code)
 Enwang language, spoken in Nigeria (by ISO 639 code)